German Bestelmeyer (8 June 1874 – 30 June 1942) was a German architect, university lecturer, and proponent of Nazi architecture. Most of his work was in South Germany.

Life and career
Bestelmeyer was born in Nuremberg, the son of a military doctor. He studied architecture from 1893 to 1897 at the Technical University of Munich under Friedrich von Thiersch and at the Academy of Fine Arts Vienna under Friedrich von Schmidt. He then worked as a building inspector and planner in Nuremberg, Regensburg, and at the University of Munich, where he designed an extension to the main building that was built in 1906–10.

In 1910 he was appointed to a professorship at the Technical University of Dresden; the following year he transferred to the Academy of Fine Arts, and in 1915 to the Academy of Fine Arts Berlin. In 1919 he also became a professor at the Technical University of Berlin-Charlottenburg. In 1922 he returned to Munich as a professor at the Technical University, and from 1934 until his death in 1942 he was President of the Bavarian Academy of Fine Arts.

Bestelmeyer was an outspoken advocate of traditionalist, völkisch architecture.  He was a member of the Munich School to which Paul Troost also belonged. In 1928, with Paul Schultze-Naumburg, Paul Schmitthenner and others, he founded "The Block", a group of architects in opposition to the modernist group The Ring. He was singled out for praise in 1931 by Schultze-Naumburg and in 1934, after the Nazis came to power, wrote an article in which he endorsed Alexander von Senger's criticism of Le Corbusier, described 1920s architecture as having become "soulless", and rejected flat roofs as unsuited to the climate in Germany. He was a member of both the Werkbund and the antisemitic Militant League for German Culture. He became a Reich Cultural Senator in 1935. He brought von Senger to the Bavarian Academy and designed buildings such as the Luftwaffe office building on the Prinzregentenstraße, which were much praised at the time. However, he also designed a number of mostly Protestant churches, some of which met with official approval, and Hitler chose his design for the Mangfall Bridge, a girder bridge on two massive concrete pylons carrying one of the new autobahns, which was influential in its simple modernity and size.

Bestelmeyer died in 1942 at the resort of Bad Wiessee. On Hitler's orders, his body was brought back to Munich and after lying in state in the Academy of Fine Arts, transferred for the state funeral to the light-court of the University of Munich which he had designed, with 300 members of the Hitler Youth in attendance.

Selected works

 Extension to Main Building of the University of Munich (1906–09)
 Adolphus Busch Hall at Harvard University, then the Germanic Museum  (1910)
 Schlosshotel im Grunewald in Berlin-Grunewald (1911–14), built as a villa for Walter von Pannwitz
 Renovation and extension of Germanisches Nationalmuseum in Nuremberg (1914–19)
 Administration building, Life Insurance Bank "Arminia" in Munich (1914–16)
 Altes Stadthaus in Bonn (1922)
 Reichsschuldenverwaltung Building in Berlin (1921–23)
 Extension Building of Technical University of Munich (1923–26)
 Kroch Tower on Augustusplatz in Leipzig (1927/28)
 Protestant Christuskirche (Church of Christ) in Neuburg an der Donau (1927–30)
 Protestant Auferstehungskirche (Church of the Resurrection) in Munich-Westend (1930–31)
 Research Building and Congress Center of the Deutsches Museum in Munich (1928–35)
Mangfall Bridge near Weyarn (1934–36)
 Luftwaffe Gau Command on Prinzregentenstraße in Munich (1935–36; now Bavarian Ministry of Economics)
 Protestant Stephanuskirche (St. Stephen's Church) in Munich Neuhausen-Nymphenburg (1936–38)

See also
 List of high rise buildings in Leipzig

References

Further reading
 Heinz Thiersch. German Bestelmeyer: Sein Leben und Wirken für die Baukunst. Munich: Callwey, 1961.

External links

 
 "Bestelmeyer German", Exhibitions, Architecture Museum of the Technical University of Munich (archived at the Wayback Machine, 24 May 2009 

1874 births
1942 deaths
Architects from Nuremberg
People from the Kingdom of Bavaria
Architects in the Nazi Party
Nazi Party politicians
Militant League for German Culture members
Technical University of Munich alumni
Academic staff of the Technical University of Berlin
Academic staff of the Technical University of Munich
19th-century German architects
20th-century German architects